Trout is an unincorporated community and census-designated place in La Salle Parish, Louisiana, United States. Trout has a post office with ZIP code 71371.

It was first listed as a CDP in the 2020 census with a population of 104.

Demographics

2020 census

Note: the US Census treats Hispanic/Latino as an ethnic category. This table excludes Latinos from the racial categories and assigns them to a separate category. Hispanics/Latinos can be of any race.

References

Unincorporated communities in LaSalle Parish, Louisiana
Unincorporated communities in Louisiana